The Wild is the seventh studio album by American rapper Raekwon. The album was released on March 24, 2017, by Ice H2O Records and Empire Distribution.

Critical reception

The Wild received generally positive reviews from critics. At Metacritic, which assigns a normalized rating out of 100 to reviews from mainstream publications, the album received an average score of 80, based on seven reviews.

Track listing

Notes
  signifies a co-producer

Charts

References

2017 albums
Raekwon albums
Albums produced by Dame Grease
Albums produced by J.U.S.T.I.C.E. League
Empire Distribution albums